The Dinner is a 2014 Italian drama film directed by Ivano De Matteo. It is loosely inspired by the novel of the same name by Herman Koch. It was screened in the Venice Days section at the 71st Venice International Film Festival, in which it won the Europa Cinemas Label as Best European Film.

Cast 

Luigi Lo Cascio : Paolo
Giovanna Mezzogiorno : Chiara
Alessandro Gassman : Massimo
Barbora Bobulova : Sofia
Rosabell Laurenti Sellers: Benedetta
Jacopo Olmo Antinori: Michele
Lidia Vitale: Giovanna
 Roberto Accornero as professor Michele

See also 
The Dinner (2013)
The Dinner (2017)

References

External links

2014 films
Italian drama films
2014 drama films
Films directed by Ivano De Matteo
Italian remakes of foreign films
Remakes of Dutch films
Films based on Dutch novels
2010s Italian films